The 1992 Scott Tournament of Hearts, the Canadian women's national curling championship, was held from February 29 to March 7, 1992 at the Halifax Metro Centre in Halifax, Nova Scotia. The total attendance for the week was 42,093.

Team Manitoba, who was skipped by Connie Laliberte won the event as they beat defending champion Julie Sutton and Team Canada 7–3 in the final after nine ends. Manitoba reached the final after beating British Columbia in the semifinal 7–6. The eight years between titles for Laliberte along with lead Janet Arnott tied Joyce McKee's then-record for the longest period between title wins.

Laliberte's rink would go onto represent Canada at the 1992 Canada Safeway World Women's Curling Championship held in Garmisch-Partenkirchen, Germany where they lost in the semifinal to eventual champion Sweden.

Additionally, the final saw the following final game records either tied or set:
 Manitoba set or tied the following steal records for a final game:
 Most stolen ends in a final game (4)
 Most points from stolen ends in a final game (5, tied record set by Team Canada in )
 Most consecutive stolen ends in a final game (3, beginning in the sixth end)
 This was also the last final until  to be conceded without any rocks being thrown in the tenth end

Teams
The teams were listed as follows:

Round Robin standings
Final Round Robin standings

Round Robin results

Draw 1

Draw 2

Draw 3

Draw 4

Draw 5

Draw 6

Draw 7

Draw 8

Draw 9

Draw 10

Draw 11

Draw 12

Draw 13

Draw 14

Draw 15

Draw 16

Draw 17

Playoffs

Semifinal

Final

Notes

References

Scotties Tournament of Hearts
Scott Tournament of Hearts
Curling competitions in Halifax, Nova Scotia
Scott Tournament
1992 in women's curling
February 1992 sports events in North America
March 1992 sports events in North America